"Treat Me Like A Lady" is the name of a 1990 single by the British pop group Five Star. It was their first single for their new record label, Epic.

The group recorded the single in their new high-tech studio (reportedly costing £2.5 million), that was built in the grounds of their family home, Stone Court, in Ascot, Berkshire. However, the single wasn't a commercial success and only reached #54 in the UK & No.130 Australia.

7" single and 7" postcard pack:

1. Treat Me Like A Lady (UK Single Mix) 4:10

2. Don't Stop

12" single and cassette single:

1. Treat Me Like A Lady (UK Extended Version) 5:24

2. Treat Me Like A Lady (Dub Lady)

3. Don't Stop

2nd 12" single:

1. Treat Me Like A Lady (Tough Mix) 5:26

2. Treat Me Like A Lady (Tough Dub)

CD single: Tent FIVE1 / Tent 655641

1. Treat Me Like A Lady (UK Single Mix)

2. Treat Me Like A Lady (UK Extended Version) 5:24

3. Treat Me Like A Lady (Dub Lady)

4. Don't Stop

US 12" single: 49733

1. Treat Me Like A Lady (Extended Mix – US version) 7:26

2. Treat Me Like A Lady (I'll Be Yours Tonite Dub) 6:11

3. Treat Me Like A Lady (Raw Mix) 6:22

2. Treat Me Like A Lady (I Can Make You Feel Dub) 4:53

US CD promo: ESK73394

1. Treat Me Like A Lady (US 7" mix) 4:19 – released on "Five Star" album

2. Treat Me Like A  Lady (Raw 7") 4:20

3. Treat Me Like A Lady (Extended Mix – US version) 7:26

4. Treat Me Like A Lady (Radio Edit) 4:37

All tracks available on the remastered version of the 2013 'Five Star' album.

References

Five Star songs
1990 singles
Songs written by Doris Pearson
Songs written by Delroy Pearson
1990 songs
Epic Records singles